Alpha Tau Sigma was a professional medical fraternity that ceased operations in 1964.

History
Alpha Tau Sigma Fraternity was a professional medical fraternity founded in 1912 at the American School of Osteopathy, now the private A.T. Still University, in Kirksville, Missouri.

Its founders were:
Charles W. Barnes
W.S. Giddings
E.E. Loose
E.E. Ruby
W.C. Warner

The Fraternity incorporated in 1915, with the intention and members were empowered to begin expansion to other recognized colleges of osteopathy. However, although the chapter remained successful on its Alpha campus, it never grew beyond a local entity.

Archived member lists note at least 45 members among one member's network, scattered in the states of Missouri, Oklahoma and Kansas, with a few elsewhere.

Alpha Tau Sigma ceased operations in 1964.

See also

 Professional fraternities and sororities

References

Defunct fraternities and sororities
Student organizations established in 1912
1912 establishments in Missouri
Professional medical fraternities and sororities in the United States